Rebecca Jane Francis  (born 7 November 1969) is a British educationalist and academic, who specialises in educational inequalities. Since January 2020, she has been Chief Executive of the Education Endowment Foundation (EEF). Before joining the EEF, she was Director of the UCL Institute of Education at University College London. She has also taught and researched at the University of Greenwich, London Metropolitan University, Roehampton University, and King's College London. She has also been Director of Education at the Royal Society of Arts (2010–12) and an advisor to the Education Select Committee of the House of Commons since 2015.

Francis was appointed Commander of the Order of the British Empire (CBE) in the 2023 New Year Honours for services to education.

Selected works

References

External links
 UCL IRIS biography

1969 births
Living people
British educational theorists
Academics of the University of Greenwich
Academics of London Metropolitan University
Academics of the University of Roehampton
Academics of King's College London
Academics of the UCL Institute of Education
Academics of University College London
British women academics
British academic administrators
Fellows of the Academy of Social Sciences
Fellows of the British Academy
Socio-economic mobility
Commanders of the Order of the British Empire